The 2016–17 Professional U23 Development League is the fifth season of the Professional Development League system, and the first since the age limit was raised from under-21 to under-23.

League 1

Premier League 2 (previously the Under 21 Premier League) was the fifth season of the competition since its introduction in 2012, and the first since being changed from an under-21 league to under-23.

The league was split into two divisions, with teams allocated places in Division 1 or 2 based on their performance in the 2015–16 season.

At the end of the season, the team which finished top of Division 1 was crowned as overall champions, and the bottom two teams in Division 1 will be relegated to Division 2 for the 2017–18 season.

Division 1

Table

Results

Division 2

Table

Results

Play-offs

League 2

The Professional U23 Development League 2, also known as U23 PDL-2 is split into two regional divisions.

Teams will play each team in their own division twice, and each team in the other division once, for a total of 28 games each.

At the end of the season, the teams finishing in the top two positions of both divisions will meet in the knockout stage to determine the overall league champion.

Tables

North Division

South Division

Knock-out stage 
Semi-finals

Final

See also
 2016–17 Professional U18 Development League
 2016–17 Premier League Cup
 2016–17 in English football

References

2016–17 in English football leagues
2016-17